Chou Yang-shan (born 24 August 1957) is a Taiwanese politician. He sat on the Legislative Yuan from 1996 to 1999, was a member of the National Assembly in 2005, and served on the Control Yuan between 2008 and 2014.

Career
Chou attended National Taiwan University (NTU), and completed graduate studies at Columbia University. He was a reporter for the China Times and United Daily News, then taught at NTU and National Chengchi University.

Chou was elected to the Legislative Yuan in 1995 from Taipei 1. He represented the New Party and was the party's caucus convener. After stepping down from the Legislative Yuan, Chou returned to NTU as a political analyst. In this position, he spoke to the media regarding foreign affairs, public opinion, the political nomination process, and constitutional reform. Though it was reported that Chou had accepted a nomination from the People First Party in the legislative elections of 2001, he was not elected to the Legislative Yuan for a second term. Instead, he represented the New Party in a case before the Central Election Commission regarding the joint nomination of Wang Chien-shien. He continued teaching at NTU, and also served as an advisor to the Control Yuan. 

Chou was elected to the National Assembly in 2005, and attended the legislative body's final meeting prior to its suspension. By 2007, he had joined the faculty of Chinese Culture University, and, backed by the New Party, launched an unsuccessful bid for the Legislative Yuan. Shortly thereafter, Chou was nominated and confirmed for a seat on the Control Yuan. In July 2009, Chou and  began investigating the Miaoli County Government's decision to remove kilns in Houlong Township in favor of urban redevelopment. Chou aided other probes regarding infrastructure, public land use, and immigration. In November 2010, Chou motioned to impeach Hu Chen-pu for misusing government funds. In January 2011, Chou disputed Lai Shin-yuan's statement that Taiwanese citizens have free choice with regard to the future because the Constitution of the Republic of China mandates unification with the mainland. That year, Chou participated in reviews exploring the possibility of simultaneous presidential and legislative elections for 2012, the South China Sea territorial disputes, and the average age of Taiwanese diplomats. In August, Chou and Ma Hsiu-ru's report on management practices at the Central News Agency led to the censure of the Government Information Office and Executive Yuan. Three months after the action against the GIO, Chou launched an investigation into Vanessa Shih, Taiwan's representative to Singapore. Upon completing the report in July 2012, Chou advocated for its conclusions to be declassified. Chou's agency eventually decided against his proposal. Though the United Daily News speculated that Chou would resign over this disagreement, he did not do so. Chou ended 2012 by finishing probes into social services for indigenous people and air pollution, while commencing an investigation into the construction of Miramar Resort Village on Shanyuan Bay in Taitung. In April 2013, a report authored by Chou pushed authorities to declassify documents relating to the 228 Incident. Controversially, this report quoted , who stated that Lee Teng-hui was of Japanese descent. That July, a report written by Chou and Ma Hsiu-ru led to the censure of the Ministry of Culture. Chou left the Control Yuan at the end of his six-year term in 2014, and later joined the faculty of National Quemoy University.

References

1957 births
Living people
National Taiwan University alumni
Academic staff of the National Taiwan University
Columbia University alumni
Academic staff of the Chinese Culture University
Academic staff of the National Chengchi University
Taiwanese journalists
New Party Members of the Legislative Yuan
Taipei Members of the Legislative Yuan
Members of the 3rd Legislative Yuan
Taiwanese Members of the Control Yuan
Leaders of the New Party (Taiwan)